The 1972 Vanderbilt Commodores football team represented Vanderbilt University in the 1972 NCAA University Division football season. The Commodores were led by head coach Bill Pace in his sixth season and finished the season with a record of three wins and eight losses (3–8 overall, 0–6 in the SEC).

Schedule

Source: 1972 Vanderbilt football schedule

References

Vanderbilt
Vanderbilt Commodores football seasons
Vanderbilt Commodores football